Ericeia korintjiensis is a moth in the  family Erebidae. It is found on Sumatra, Java and Borneo. The habitat consists of forested areas up to altitudes of about 1,790 meters.

References

Moths described in 1928
Ericeia